Charles Tompson (26 June 1807 – 5 January 1883) was an Australian public servant and it is claimed he was the first published Australian-born poet.

Tompson was born in 1806 at Sydney, eldest child of Charles Tompson (c1784–1871), a farmer, and his wife, Elizabeth, née Boggis. Tompson senior had been convicted at Warwick, England, in March 1802, and arrived in Sydney aboard the Coromandel in May 1804. Tompson junior was educated at the Henry Fulton's school at Castlereagh, and entered the New South Wales public service. In 1826 he published Wild Notes, from the Lyre of a Native Minstrel, by Charles Tompson, jun., the first volume of verse by one of the native-born to be published in Australia. Tompson was just 20 years old when his volume was published. Considered as juvenilia it has some merit, but its chief interest lies in its having been the first of its kind. He wrote some verse and much prose in later life, none of which has been collected in a volume.

One poem, Australia. A Translation of the Latin Prize Poem of S. Smith, a Student of Hyde Abbey School, Winchester, appeared in the Sydney Gazette for 17 December 1829, and was published shortly after as a two-paged pamphlet, now rare.

Tompson married Hannah Morris at St Matthew's, Windsor, on 12 April 1830; by 1831 he was living in Kent Street, Sydney, and had become a clerk in the colonial secretary's office. Tompson remained there until 1836 when he returned to his Doon Moor Cottage, Penrith where he was a clerk of petty sessions. Later he was clerk at Camden.

Tompson was then appointed third clerk in the Legislative Council of New South Wales, rose to be clerk of parliaments in the legislative council, and, in 1860, clerk of the legislative assembly, where he was much liked by members as a courteous and obliging officer. He retired on a pension on 31 January 1869 and died at Sydney on 5 January 1883.

References

1807 births
1883 deaths
Australian male poets
Australian people of English descent
Clerks
19th-century Australian public servants
19th-century Australian poets
19th-century male writers